Percy Austin Decker (August 4, 1890 – August 18, 1936) was a Boatswain's Mate, Second Class in the United States Navy and a Medal of Honor recipient for his role in the United States occupation of Veracruz.

Decker was promoted to the rank of ensign on August 15, 1918, and to lieutenant on March 3, 1922.

He died while on active duty on August 18, 1936, and is buried in Arlington National Cemetery, Arlington, Virginia.

Medal of Honor citation
Rank and organization: Boatswain's Mate Second Class, U.S. Navy. Born: August 4, 1890, New York, N.Y. Accredited to: New York. G.O. No.: 101, 15 June 10.

Citation:

On board the U.S.S. Florida during the seizure of Vera Cruz, Mexico, 21 April 1914; for extraordinary heroism in the line of his profession during the seizure of Vera Cruz, Mexico.

See also

 List of Medal of Honor recipients (Veracruz)

References

External links
 

1890 births
1936 deaths
United States Navy Medal of Honor recipients
United States Navy sailors
Military personnel from New York City
Burials at Arlington National Cemetery
United States Navy personnel of World War I
Battle of Veracruz (1914) recipients of the Medal of Honor